Ahmad Zaidi Adruce bin Muhammed Noor (29 March 1924 – 5 December 2000) was the fifth Yang di-Pertua Negeri of Sarawak (Governor of Sarawak). He was the longest-serving governor of Sarawak (in consecutive terms from a single appointment), from his inaugural in 1985, to his death in 2000. He was also remembered as the first Sarawakian Bumiputera to receive a MA Degree from a British university (University of Edinburgh).

Personal life
Ahmad Zaidi was born on 29 March 1924 to Muhammad Noor (father) and Siti Saadiah (mother) on a small boat on the Rajang River near Kampung Semop, Daro, Sarawak. His father was a farmer while his mother was a housewife. He was adopted by descendents of Syarif Masahor (a Rajang basin chief that opposed Brooke rule from 1860 to 1862). Sharifah Mai was a daughter of Syarif Masahor. She has a unmarried daughter named Sharifah Dayang Aisah who later adopted Ahmad Zaidi. Sharifah Mai also has a childless son named Wan Abu Bakar Adruce.

Ahmad Zaidi Adruce was married to Hjh Hamsiah Bte Hj Ismail (born 22 November 1923) and had eight children. During his exile in Indonesia, he later married Toh Puan Datuk Patinggi Hajjah Rosmiati Kendati, and had four more children.

Education
At 5 years old, he was sent to two schools, Chung Hua and also Abang Ali in Sibu, where he developed interest in poetry, gymnastic and acting. At age 12 he passed his standard seven exam with exemplary marks – which at the time was an achievement far beyond what was expected of a young man born and raised in Sarawak. Ahmad Zaidi was an exceptionally bright student, who was always either first or second in class throughout his primary and secondary education. After his standard seven exam, he moved to Kuching to further his studies and joined St. Thomas school in 1936, where he graduated with a Junior Cambridge qualification in 1938. Out of 63 students, he was among the seven who passed – and of the seven, Ahmad Zaidi was the only bumiputera. He joined an Anglo-Chinese school in Singapore in 1938 and graduated in 1939 at 15 years old with a Cambridge School Certificate, and was at the time the only bumiputera to have achieved such an honour.

In November 1940, Ahmad Zaidi joined the Sultan Idris College in Tanjung Malim, Perak, where he studied until the Japanese invasion in 1941, when he was forced to flee to Singapore. In 1942 he was sent to Java to study Veterinary Medicine at Buitenzorg College in Bogor. He did not complete his veterinary training when the war ended in 1945 and was instead pulled into fighting against the Dutch in Indonesia, where he witnessed first-hand the early days of the Indonesian National Revolution. In 1947, he returned to Sarawak where he was then appointed as a teacher at Batu Lintang Training Center. During that year he also set up the first Sea Scout movement in Borneo and took his students sailing as far as Tanjung Datu on the western tip of Borneo Island and as far north to the Saribas River, an enterprise that would later help him establish an intelligence and underground movement to assist the Republic of Indonesia in their guerilla warfare against the Dutch.

In 1949, the British awarded Ahmad Zaidi a four-year Colonial Development and Welfare scholarship to further his studies at the Robert Gordons Technical College in Aberdeen before he was enrolled to the University of Edinburgh in the United Kingdom. On 28 May 1953, he was invited to represent Sarawakian students to attend the Coronation of Queen Elizabeth II where he also met with Temenggong Jugah. Ahmad Zaidi secured his MA degree in Political Economy in 1953 from the University of Edinburgh and later secured a Certificate in Education from the University of London in 1955. Upon his return to Sarawak, he was promoted to the post of supervisor at a training college and later became the acting president of the Barisan Pemuda Sarawak in 1956 which was an organisation that united the bumiputeras to work towards the independence of Sarawak. He met with Tan Sri Ghazali Shafie and later with Tunku Abdul Rahman to support the movement towards the formation of Malaysia.

Early political career
Ahmad Zaidi Adruce had a turbulent political career. His involvement in politics began in earnest while he was studying at Buitenzorg College (Current Bogor Agricultural University) in Bogor, then Japanese-occupied Netherlands East Indies (present-day Indonesia).

Ahmad Zaidi was opposed to colonialist ideology, and the experiences of being discriminated while in the United Kingdom did little to endear his feelings towards the colonial government that ruled over his people. The buildup for the movement towards independence had become so intense that there were even plots to either arrest or assassinate Ahmad Zaidi for being a very public rebel to the colonial government. He knew that at that stage even if Sarawak was able to attain independence, the machineries for the new Malaysian government will mostly be influenced by those Sarawakians who had worked for the colonial government. In the transition phase towards the formation of a new government, he received insider information that some of the expatriates who worked under the colonial administration preferred that he be eliminated for fear of revenge if Ahmad Zaidi became in control. He was dubbed a traitor by British authorities and supporters including many of the expatriates in the Sarawak government because of his strong influence and involvement in Barisan Pemuda Sarawak and suspected connection with Indonesia during the Indonesia-Malaysia Confrontation.

He was then abducted from Sarawak by his sympathizers and later went into self-exile in Indonesia until he was given amnesty by the Malaysian government in 1969, a move strongly supported by Tun Abdul Rahman Ya'kub, where the latter was a federal minister at the time.

After exiled for six months in Jakarta, Indonesia, Ahmad Zaidi was convinced that his troubles had died down. On 12 May 1969, he telephoned Normah Abdullah, the wife of chief minister of Sarawak at that time, Abdul Rahman Ya'kub to go back to Kuala Lumpur. However, Normah warned Ahmad Zaidi of brewing racial riots in Kuala Lumpur. The racial riots later developed into 13 May incident. Ahmad Zaidi returned to Kuching, Sarawak instead. Ahmad Zaidi also found that his step-father Wan Abu Bakar Adruce, Ahmad Zaidi's own son Bujang, and Anie Dhoby (brother of Rosli Dhoby) joined Sarawak National Party (SNAP). Stephen Kalong Ningkan, the former Sarawak chief minister and the leader of the SNAP party, invited Ahmad Zaidi to lead the Malay faction in the party. However, Ahmad Zaidi decided to retire from politics. Later, some members of the public still questioned him regarding his loyalty to Sarawak. Ahmad Zaidi again decided to take a break in the Java island, Indonesia.

In 1970s, Ahmad Zaidi became uneasy with the governing style of United Sabah National Organisation (USNO) on Sabah people. Ahmad Zaidi later developed good relationship with Harris Salleh, one of the leaders of the Sabah People's United Front (BERJAYA party). One month before the 1974 Malaysian general election, Ahmad Zaidi discovered a plot to kidnap Harris. Ahmad Zaidi informed Harris about the plot and the latter successfully escaped from the plot. In 1976 Sabah state election, although Ahmad Zaidi was a Sarawak cabinet minister, he openly campaigned for Harris's BERJAYA party. BERJAYA won the state election, ousting USNO from power. However, Harris involvement in Sabah politics gained animosity with several Sabah local leaders. They complained to chief minister of Sarawak Abdul Rahman Ya'kub. Later, Ahmad Zaidi found himself sidelined from Sarawak state politics. There were also rumours where Ahmad Zaidi would be replaced in his own Kalaka state constituency.

Appointment as Yang di-Pertua Negeri Sarawak 
When the Ming Court Affair was brewing in 1985, Abdul Taib Mahmud, the chief minister of Sarawak at that time, decided to remove the governor Abdul Rahman Ya'kub from office due dispute between them. Yang di-Pertuan Agong (king) of Malaysia at that time, Sultan Iskandar met Ahmad Zaidi privately. The king ordered Ahmad Zaidi to raise his hand to recite an oath of allegiance to the country.

On 1 April 1985, Ahmad Zaidi Adruce was appointed as the fifth Yang di-Pertua Negeri of Sarawak (Governor) Sarawak before the Speaker at the Sarawak State Legislative Assembly. 

On 2 April 1985, he also took the oath of office in front of then king. He held the office for 15 years, the longest-serving governor in any Malaysian state without a hereditary ruler (in consecutive terms from a single appointment).

Health
In 1974, while Ahmad Zaidi was taking a break in a family house in Bandung, Indonesia, he had a blackout and fractured his lumbar spine (lower backbone).

Death
Ahmad Zaidi Adruce served three terms before passing on peacefully on 5 December 2000, leaving behind a lasting legacy as a true nationalist and as his people's first scholar. He was given a state funeral and was buried at Samariang Muslim Cemetery, Petra Jaya, Kuching.

Honours

Honours of Malaysia
 : 
  Grand Commander of the Order of Loyalty to the Crown of Malaysia (S.S.M.) - Tun (1987)
  Grand Commander of the Order of the Defender of the Realm (S.M.N.) - Tun (1989) 
 :
  Knight Commander of the Most Exalted Order of the Star of Sarawak (P.N.B.S.) – Dato Sri (1981)
  Knight Grand Commander of the Order of the Star of Hornbill Sarawak (D.P.) – Datuk Patinggi (1988)
 :
  Knight Grand Commander of the Exalted Order of the Crown of Kedah (S.P.M.K.) – Dato' Seri (1997)
 :
  Knight Grand Commander of the Order of the Crown of Selangor (S.P.M.S.) – Dato' Seri (1994)
 :
  Member Grand Companion of the Order of Sultan Mahmud I of Terengganu (S.S.M.T.) – Dato' Seri (1996)
 :
  Knight Grand Commander of the Exalted Order of Melaka (D.U.N.M.) - Datuk Seri Utama (1987)
 :
  Knight Grand Commander of the Order of the Defender of State (D.U.P.N.) – Dato' Seri Utama (1990)
 :
  Grand Commander of the Order of Kinabalu (S.P.D.K.) – Datuk Seri Panglima (1996)

Foreign honours
 : 
  Star of Mahaputera, 2nd Class (1986)
 : 
  First Class of the Order of Paduka Seri Laila Jasa (P.S.L.J.) – Dato Paduka Seri Laila Jasa (1989)

Other honours
 Ijazah Kehormat Doktor Undang-Undang, Universiti Kebangsaan Malaysia – 6 August 1993
  Pingat Semangat Padi – 24 February 1990

Places named after him
Several places were named after him, including:
 SMK Agama Tun Ahmad Zaidi (SMKA TUNAZ), an Islamic religious school in Kuching, Sarawak
 Jalan Tun Ahmad Zaidi Adruce, is a major road in Kuching and Sibu, Sarawak
 Tun Ahmad Zaidi Residential College, a residential college at University of Malaya, Kuala Lumpur
 Kolej Tun Ahmad Zaidi, a residential college at Universiti Malaysia Sarawak, Kota Samarahan, Sarawak
 Tun Zaidi Stadium, a stadium in Sibu, Sarawak

References

Melanau people
Malaysian politicians
Malaysian Muslims
1924 births
2000 deaths
Yang di-Pertua Negeri of Sarawak
People from Sarawak

Grand Commanders of the Order of the Defender of the Realm
Grand Commanders of the Order of Loyalty to the Crown of Malaysia
Knights Commander of the Most Exalted Order of the Star of Sarawak
Knights Grand Commander of the Order of the Star of Hornbill Sarawak
Alumni of the University of Edinburgh
Bogor Agricultural University alumni
Knights Grand Commander of the Order of the Crown of Selangor